Have Mercy is an album by a rock band called The Mooney Suzuki.

After the band finished touring for Alive and Amplified, they had some troubles. Founder guitarist Graham Tyler's father died, a strong supporter of the band from its early days, and Graham left to tend to his family. Then, the rhythm section dropped out. Sammy James Jr., guitarist and singer, wrote many of these songs during the troubled time. When he finally got around to recording them, Graham had rejoined, along with the original drummer, Will Rockwell-Scott.

Current bass player Reno Bo and ex-bass player Michael Bangs are both credited with backing vocals in the liner notes. Ironically, neither of them actually plays bass. Sammy James Jr. covers that.

After all of this, the band eyed an August 2006 release. However, their label V2 Records instead changed it to January 2007 for a better publicity push. Then, V2 folded, and the band spent 5 months looking for a way to release the album. It finally came out in June 2007 with bonus tracks on Elixiia Records/Templar Label Group.

The cover art resembles Soft Machine's album Third.

Track listing 
99%
This Broke Heart of Mine
Adam & Eve
Ashes
Rock 'n' Roller Girl
First Comes Love
Mercy Me
Good Ol' Alcohol
The Prime of Life
Down But Not Out
Leap of Faith (bonus track)
You Never Really Wanted To Rock 'n' Roll (bonus track)
Caroline (digital bonus track only)
Say That You Will (digital bonus track only)

References 

2007 albums
The Mooney Suzuki albums